Franz Sedlacek (3 September 1892 – 18 July 1933) was an Austrian footballer. He played in eleven matches for the Austria national football team from 1913 to 1918.

References

External links
 

1892 births
1933 deaths
Austrian footballers
Austria international footballers
Place of birth missing
Association footballers not categorized by position